The Old Lie is a 2019 novel by Claire G. Coleman. It is about Earth joining an alien force, the Federation, to defend against another, the Conglomeration.

Reception
A reviewer in Locus, although finding The Old Lie "an infuriating novel to read," concludes that "what ultimately shines through is Coleman’s passion, her fury and, most importantly, her keen sense of justice." 

The Adelaide Review wrote that "Coleman interrogates our own recent past and present from stolen generations and Maralinga weapons testing to the age-old capacity for cold, bureaucratic inhumanity exhibited by aliens and humans alike."

The Old Lie has also been reviewed by The Canberra Times, The Saturday Paper, The Sydney Morning Herald and Australian Book Review.

See also
 Terra Nullius

References

External links
Library holdings of The Old Lie
Native Apocalypse in Claire G. Coleman’s The Old Lie
Coleman discusses The Old Lie at the Sydney Writers' Festival
Discussion with Coleman on The Book Show about The Old Lie 

2019 Australian novels
Australian science fiction novels
2019 science fiction novels
Military science fiction novels
Indigenous Australian science fiction
Hachette Book Group books